Mélissa Désormeaux-Poulin (born in July 1981), is a French Canadian actress.

Biography
Mélissa Désormeaux-Poulin was born to a family unconnected with the dramatic arts: her mother is a director of communications and her father is a teacher. She studied at an arts school at Lanaudière.

Career
Mélissa Désormeaux-Poulin made her debut as an actress in an advertising campaign for the cereals Magic Crunch and Magic Post at the age of six. She was chosen later to act in the series Jamais deux sans toi (1989-1993), followed by the role of Marie in the series Une faim de loup (1990). Her next role was in the series Les Héritiers Duval (1994-1996). Her versatility and breadth as an actress have been showcased in roles such as the disabled Madeleine (in Asbestos, 2002), a Spanish militant (in Chartrand et Simonne, 2003), a drug dealer (in Grand Ourse, 2003) and as a disorganised rebel (in Emma, 2000-2004).

The role that brought her the most fame, especially among Canadian teens, is that in the successful À vos marques... party! franchise about a high-school swimming team. She had a regular role in the series La Promesse, which ended in 2012.

In 2008, she participated in Dédé à travers les brumes against  Sébastien Ricard. In 2010, she played Jeanne Marwan in the Academy Award nominated film Incendies.

Filmography

Cinema 
 2005: La Sauvegarde
 2007: Taking the Plunge (À vos marques... party!) : Gaby Roberge 
 2009: Through the Mist (Dédé, à travers les brumes) : Sophie
 2009: Taking the Plunge 2 (À vos marques... party! 2) : Gaby Roberge
 2010: Incendies : Jeanne Marwan
 2012: Hors les murs : Anka 
 2013: Gabrielle : Sophie
 2017: Threesome (Le Trip à trois): Estelle
 2018: The Far Shore (Dérive): Catherine Beauregard

Television 
 2020- : Épidémie : Chloé Roy-Bélanger
 2016-2019: Ruptures : Ariane Beaumont
 2014–2018: Mensonges : Carla Moreli
 2014: 30 Vies : Lou Gauthier
 2014: Ces gars-là : Amélie
 2014: Subito texto : Isabelle Milani
 2012: Mon meilleur ami : Eve
 2012: Lance et compte : Marie-Josée Gignac 
 2010–2012: Les Rescapés : Thérèse Desbiens
 2006–2011: La Promesse : Florence Daveluy
 2004–2009: Il était une fois dans le trouble : Julia
 2004: Les Bougon, c'est aussi ça la vie! : Floralie
 2000–2004: Ramdam : Isabelle
 2000–2004: Emma : Sara Bernard
 2000–2004 : Le Monde de Charlotte : Judith
 2003: Grande Ourse : Colombe
 2002: Asbestos : Madeleine
 2003: Chartrand et Simonne, la suite : Spanish militant in FRAP.
 2001: L'Enfant de la télé : Rita
 1998: Coroner Premier rôle : Cathia Hunter
 1997: La Courte Échelle II : Ozzie
 1997–1999: La Part des anges : Camille Dansereau
 1994–1996: Les Héritiers Duval : Marie-Andrée Régnier
 1993: Écoute ton cœur : Pascale
 1989–1993: Jamais deux sans toi : Marie-Andrée Régnier
 1991: Livrofolies, Alice au pays des merveilles : Alice
 1991: Livrofolies, Les Malheurs de Sophie : Sophie
 1990: Une faim de loup : Marie

Theatre 
 Danse, petites désobéissances : Ève

Awards and nominations

References

External links 
 

1981 births
Living people
French Quebecers
Actresses from Montreal
Canadian child actresses
Canadian film actresses
Canadian television actresses
Canadian stage actresses
Best Supporting Actress Jutra and Iris Award winners